Events in the year 2015 in Bulgaria.

Incumbents 

 President: Rosen Plevneliev
 Prime Minister: Boyko Borisov

Events 

 14 January – The government says it will extend a controversial fence along its border with Turkey by 80 km to help stem the flow of illegal immigrants.

Deaths
December 5 - Dimitar Iliev Popov, prime minister (1990-1991)

References 

 
2010s in Bulgaria
Years of the 21st century in Bulgaria
Bulgaria
Bulgaria